George Sirochman Jr. (March 23, 1918 – January 2, 1996) was an American football player. He was sometimes known by the nickname "Blondy" Sirochman.

Sirochman was born in La Belle, Pennsylvania, and attended Centerville High School in Ohio. He then played college football for Duquesne from 1939 to 1941. He was a starter at guard for the undefeated 1941 Duquesne team. 

Sirochman also played professional football in the National Football League (NFL) as a guard for the Pittsburgh Steelers in 1942 and Detroit Lions in 1944. He appeared in 11 NFL games, one as a starter. He also played eight games (three as a starter) for the Wilmington Clippers of the American Football League during their 1947 season.

Sirochman died in 1996 in Washington, Pennsylvania.

References

1918 births
1996 deaths
American football guards
Duquesne Dukes football players
Pittsburgh Steelers players
Detroit Lions players
Players of American football from Pennsylvania